Myrton Nathan Basing (October 29, 1900 – April 29, 1957) was a halfback in the National Football League.

Biography
Basing was born Myrton Nathan Basing on October 29, 1900 in Appleton, Wisconsin. He died in 1957 in Colorado Springs, Colorado.

Career
Basing played with the Green Bay Packers for five seasons. He played at the collegiate level at Lawrence University.

See also
List of Green Bay Packers players

References

1900 births
1957 deaths
American football halfbacks
Green Bay Packers players
Lawrence Vikings football players
Sportspeople from Appleton, Wisconsin
Players of American football from Wisconsin